Eleutherodactylus inoptatus (common name: Diquini robber frog) is a species of frog in the family Eleutherodactylidae endemic to Hispaniola; it is found both in Haiti and the Dominican Republic.

Eleutherodactylus inoptatus is a common frog found in mesic hardwood forest. It can also live in coffee and banana plantations as long as there are trees and shade. It is impacted by habitat loss.

References

inoptatus
Endemic fauna of Hispaniola
Amphibians of the Dominican Republic
Frogs of Haiti
Amphibians described in 1914
Taxonomy articles created by Polbot
Taxa named by Thomas Barbour